Monkey Mia Airport  is an airport located on the Peron Peninsula within the Shark Bay World Heritage site in the Gascoyne region serving Monkey Mia, a resort in Western Australia, and the nearby town of Denham.

Airlines and destinations

See also
 List of airports in Western Australia
 Aviation transport in Australia

References

External links
 Airservices Aerodromes & Procedure Charts

Airports in Western Australia
Shark Bay